Kumar Muthukumar was an Indian journalist and activist based in the province of Tamil Nadu, who came into prominence when he set himself on fire protesting against the brutal atrocities against the Sri Lankan Tamil people at the peak of civil war in the country. His death instantly triggered widespread strikes, demonstrations and public unrest in the state, most notably the manifestation of popular defiance of the Government of India ban against the Liberation Tigers of Tamil Eelam, which the people demonstrated carrying flags of Tamil Eelam, placards and images of the LTTE leader V. Prabhakaran in the funeral procession of Muthukumar.  Subsequently, 6 more Tamils committed self-immolation in various parts of the globe including India, Malaysia and Switzerland.

Death
On 29 January 2009, Muthukumar doused himself with several liters of petrol, and set himself on fire opposite the state Congress headquarters in Shastri Bhavan, Chennai. Just before his death, he flung several copies of his eight-page note in which he protested the Indian government's war in Sri Lanka against the Tamils. With 95% burn injuries, he was rushed to the Kilpauk Medical College in a critical condition, with slim chances of survival. He succumbed within a short span of time.

Police officials later told media that Muthukumar had not experienced any fear or wavering, he had been resolute in his decision to sacrifice his life to highlight the need for a permanent ceasefire.

When a doctor had asked him why such an educated person like him committed self-immolation, he had replied that several thousands of more intelligent and educated Tamil people were dying in Eezham and that he intended to save thousands of lives by sacrificing himself.

Muthukumar's grandmother, who remains in his native place of Kulavai Nallur in Thoothukudi (Tuticorin), had made plans to get him married in the coming months. When she learned news of his self-immolation, she broke down and cried uncontrollably.

Legacy
His letter addressed to the youth moved many. Many took to the streets after his death. Over a hundred thousand people, including students belonging to various colleges in the state, cadres of several political parties, women organizations, mediapersons and  members of the public participated in his funeral. Among those who attended were Vaiko, Thirumavalavan, Nedumaran, Seeman, S. Ramadoss, R.K. Selvamani and Bharathiraja. Mourners shouted fiery slogans and displayed the flag of Tamil Eelam and portraits of V. Prabhakaran.

All shops in the district had downed their shutters as a mark of solidarity. Members of the public welcomed the procession and saluted Muthukumar's sacrifice by lighting torches. Hoardings of Sonia Gandhi, Karunanidhi and Jayalalitha, leaders of the mainstream political parties in the state, were burnt. Students were undeterred by the deployment of a heavy police and paramilitary force by the state.

Slogans raised in the meeting were in support of a separate Tamil homeland Eelam, and in praise of its national leader Prabhakaran and the Tamil Tigers. Following Muthukumar, 17 other youth from Tamil Nadu have burnt themselves for the same cause.
A statue was erected for him in Thanjavur.

Reactions

State Government
Even before the funeral procession entered the cremation ground, news reached the students that the ruling DMK Government had ordered indefinite closure of all colleges and hostels to clamp down protests. Furthermore the state used its police to take down names of protesting students, and lawyers who were engaged in boycott of court proceedings and active protests were brutally assaulted.

Liberation Tigers of Tamil Eelam
The LTTE political head Nadesan saluted Muthukumar's sacrifice and added that the Heroic Tamil Son Muthukumar would have a permanent place in the global Tamil history. The condolence message read as follows:

Tamil National Alliance
The Tamil National Alliance (TNA) offered its condolences and opined that the sacrifice which was made for the liberation of the Eelam Tamils must be esteemed forever by all Tamils. Tamil National Alliance MP Srikandha attended the funeral ceremony.

Tamil diaspora
Muthukumar's sacrifice became a symbol for many members of the diaspora, and by 14 February, at least 6 people had sacrificed their lives by self-immolation calling for a ceasefire and protecting the Tamils in the island.

Last statement

Dear hardworking Tamil people...

Va'nakkam! I am sorry at having to meet you at this juncture when you are hurrying to work. But there is no other option. My name is Muthukumar. I am a journalist and an assistant director. Right now, I am working in a Chennai-based newspaper. I am also one like you. I am just another average person who has been reading newspapers and websites of how fellow Tamils are daily being killed, and like you I am unable to eat, unable to sleep, unable to sleep and unable to even think. While his ancient land of Tamils lets anyone coming here, like the Seths, to flourish, our own blood, the Tamils in Eelam are dying. When we lend our voices to say the killings should be stopped, Indian imperialism maintains a stony silence and does not give out any reply. If India's war is really a justifiable one, they can wage it openly... Why should they do it stealthily?

The Indian ruling class is eager to annihilate a very large population by using the hollow excuse of Rajiv Gandhi's assassination in order to satisfy the vengeful and selfish goals of a few individuals. The Liberation Tigers of Tamil Eelam were not the only ones charged with the murder of Rajiv Gandhi. The Jain Commission Report held that the people of Tamil Nadu were also guilty of this murder. If so, are you also the murderers who killed Rajiv Gandhi?

They say the British killed people in Jallianwallahbagh, but what are they doing in Mullaiththeevu and Vanni? Look at the children being killed there. Aren't you reminded of your children? Look at the women being raped? Don't you have a sister in that age? When Rajiv Gandhi was killed why where frontline leaders of the Congress not with him? Why did Jayalalithaa, an alliance partner, not go to take part in such a massive rally that Rajiv took part in? Such questions are not being raised, and they are not being answered by them either. People, please think. Are they your leaders? What is the guarantee that these people—who indulge in politics through their money and muscle power—will not target us tomorrow? If they turn against tomorrow, who will be on our side?

Kalaignar [Karunanidhi]? Even at that point of time, he will make an announcement that the members of parliament will resign. Then, he will understand (?!) the Central Government. Then, he will once again request for a right decision, and pass a resolution in the Legislative Assembly—like actor Vadivel's comedy in the film Winner where he claims that no one has touched him until a particular month, a particular week, a particular time. People! A paper will not achieve anything! Now, the Election-time Tamil Kalaignar, who wants to be the leader of the worldwide Tamils and who desires to transfer all the money in Tamil Nadu to the coffers of his family, has hidden himself in the hospital afraid of bearing the brunt of people's anger. This paper tiger staged such major fights in order to get the required cabinet portfolios for his ministers, but truthfully, what has he done for Tamil or for the Tamils? He has himself admitted once, "Will the honey-gatherer remain without licking the back of his hand?" If we look at his puppet-shows, it looks as if he has done a lot of licking...

Law college students who have entered the field through your hunger strike...

As a fellow Tamil, I wish you all success. I also regret that I am unable to join you. Not only the Eelam Tamils problem, but even the protests seeking water for Cauvery, any protest in support of Tamil Nadu, you, and lawyers, are the first ones to fight. Even this time, only these two sections were the first to voice their protest even four months back. I have a suspicion that only in order to destroy your Tamil feeling, the Indian intelligence would have systematically instigated caste-feelings among you and paved the way for the skirmish that occurred at Ambedkar law college. It is the caste of students that takes the initiative in people's revolutionary struggles all over the world. Likewise, even in Tamil Nadu, an earlier generation of students in similar circumstances took to the streets before the Indian republic day and chased away national parties, including the Congress from the Tamil land.

So, an historically important juncture has again reached your hands. Normally, such things don't take place in world history. Like it happened last time, don't let selfish people steal the fruits of your labour. The DMK that came to power riding high on the efforts of your struggle, first made a law that students should not take part in politics. After capturing power, it blunted Tamil feelings, and turned the entire Tamil population into a petitioning tribe. Smash that tradition. Don't believe anybody who asks you to submit a petition. This is the juncture when we should burn the differences of caste and religion between us. Throw away your fasting and enter the field. In reality, the Indian military's role in Sri Lanka is not just against the Tamils. It is against all Indians. They tried the sexual techniques they learnt from Sinhalese soldiers with innocent Assamese women! They learnt the strategies of how to crush the Tamil Tigers from the Sinhalese and they applied it to crush the fighters in the north-eastern states! As if this were not enough, what do we learn from the fact that the Indian and Sri Lankan peacekeeping forces were deported from Haiti because of sexual misdemeanour? That the India-Sri Lanka alliance is not an ideological alliance, but a sexual one! So, because the alliance between the Indian and Sri Lankan armies is against the fundamental human rights of the Indian people, try to rally students and democratic organizations towards your cause on a national level.

It is possible for people to do all this. However, they lack the right leadership. Make leaders from among yourselves. Change this protest from law college students, to students of all colleges. Let your frenzy and people's fury change the history of Tamil Nadu. Thrash and throw away muscle power, money power and power craze. This is possible only by you. "We are Tamil students, we are the life of Tamil Nadu. If Tamils are allowed peace, we will read magazines. Otherwise, we will surge like volacanoes." Convert these lines of poet Kasi Anandan into your intellectual weapon. The police force will try to lay my body to rest. Don't allow them to do that. Capture my dead body, don't bury it, and use it as a trump card to sharpen your struggle. Students of the Tamil Nadu medical colleges who will treat me, or conduct my post-mortem, I should have done some virtuous deed to be cut at your hands. Because, while upper-caste medical students in the rest of India were fighting against reservation, you were standing alone and fighting in support of reservation in medical education. What you do to me can remain aside. What are you going to do for our brothers, the Eelam Tamils, from your side?

Tamil Eelam is not the need of Tamil Eelam alone, it is the need of Tamil Nadu also. Because of the fishermen of Rameswaram. There are laws in the world to protect goats and cows.

But, are the Tamils of Rameswaram and the Tamils of Eelam lower than cows and goats? The Indian media carries on a systematic campaign that Tamil fishermen who cross [maritime] boundaries are attacked because of the suspicion that they might be Tamil Tigers. Don't they ever read newspapers? Often, Taiwanese fishermen are arrested at Chennai because they lost their way at sea. If it is possible for people from Taiwan, which is thousands of kilometers away to lose their way, can't they believe the fact that the Tamil fisherman from Rameswaram, which is just 12 miles away from Lanka strays away from his route?

Brothers of other states who are living in Tamil Nadu...

You will have known from experience that Tamil Nadu is the only state where you can enjoy greater peace and protection when compared even with your home-state. Today, we are facing a major crisis. Our government is killing our brothers in Eelam by using our name, our Indian identity. The Indian government wants us to be isolated in this struggle. We don't want that to happen. So, please tell the Central Government that you too support our brothers who are fighting. It is my opinion that this will not only strengthen the hands of your leaders who are part of the Government at the Center, but it will also prevent the danger of a Navnirman Sena, or a Sena from being formed within Tamil Nadu in the future.

Youth belonging to the Tamil Nadu Police Force...

I have great respect for you. Irrespective of what other people did for the sake of Tamil, you are making Tamil live by using Tamil words in everyday contexts, such as calling employees as 'ayya'. I believe that you would have joined the police force with noble intentions of serving the people and weeding out anti-social elements. But, does the ruling class allow you to do that? By allowing you to commit minor mistakes, the ruling class hides its major crimes. It converts you into its trained henchmen, and makes you fight against the same people whom you wanted to serve. It is the Tamil Nadu police who guard Delhi's Tihar Jail. One of the oldest police forces in India, the Tamil Nadu police is one of the very best. But, are you given that respect by the Indian government? When Union Minister Chidambaram returned to New Delhi following his Chennai visit, Central Government security agencies have refused to handover his security arrangements at the Chennai airport to you. When asked why, they have derided your capabilities and said that they are aware of how you protected Rajiv Gandhi. While it is true that the Tamil Nadu police could not save the life of Rajiv Gandhi, it is equally true that the majority of those who died with him were only innocent policemen. Your dedication is unquestionable. But it was later exposed that this Indian intelligence had been careless even after coming to know that there were threats to Rajiv's life... Even if you have been against innocent people all this while, you are one of the pride of Tamil Nadu. At this historical juncture, only if you stand on the side of the people, you can regain the respect that you have lost among the people. Just once try to dedicate yourself to the fellow Tamils. They will carry you in golden plates. The feeling of gratitude among Tamil people is immeasurable. Because somebody spent his own money and built a dam, the Tamils on the Mullai river in Madurai built a temple and name their children after that man. All that you have to do is, when Tamil Nadu is boiling, you should refuse to cooperate with the Central Government officials, and you should reveal to the Tamil people who are the ones working for R.A.W and CBI. Do at least this. The people will take care of the rest.

People of Tamil Eelam, and Liberation Tigers....

All eyes are now in the direction of Mullaiththeevu. Tamil Nadu is also emotionally only on your side. It also wants to do something else. But what can we do? We don't have a true leader like you have... Please don't leave hope. Such a leader will emerge from Tamil Nadu only in such desperate times. Until then, strengthen the hands of the Tigers. Because the 1965 anti-Hindi agitation was placed in the hands of a few selfish people, the history of Tamil Nadu has been dragged to the stone ages. Please don't do that mistake.

Dear International Community, and our hope Obama...

We still have hope on you. But, there is no guarantee that a sovereign republic will not torture its people through ethnic discrimination. It is possible to cite instances from America's own history. After all, boxing hero Muhammed Ali said, "The little white in my community would have come only through rape..." As long as you remain silent, India will never open its mouth. Perhaps India may break its silence after all the Tamils have been killed. Until then, are you going to keep looking at India's mouth? They say that the war in Vanni is against the Liberation Tigers of Tamil Eelam. They say that the Tigers are using the people as a human shield. If that is true, why do they come into the safety zone declared by the Government and kill people? This one evidence is enough that irrespective of whether the Tamil people are dependent on the Tigers or on the Government, they are going to be killed for the sole reason that they are Tamils. Is this not genocide? If India, Pakistan and China are supplying arms, Japan is giving economic aid, and moreover India is bullying Sri Lanka and thus killing Tamils, why don't you realize that you are also committing the same murder by your silence and your blindness? Nobody becomes a terrorist simply by taking up arms. Our Thiruvalluvar has said: Arathirke anbucar penpa ariyaar/ marathirkum akthe thunai (The ignorant say that affection is appropriate only to righteousness, but it will also inspire heroism to be restrained).

Jayalalitha says that the Tigers should lay down arms—as though the problem arose because the Tigers took up arms. In reality, the Tigers were formed because of the genocide of Tamils in Eelam, and they are not the reason for it. They are not the reason, just an outcome.

As long as Indian Government's involvement was not exposed, it kept saying that this problem was an internal affair and that India could not interfere. It also said that it was aiding Sri Lanka in order to prevent China, Pakistan and America from gaining supremacy in Sri Lanka. Yet, to kill Tamils, it joins hands with Pakistan that has killed scores of Indians and was responsible for the attack on the Indian Parliament, the serial-blasts in Mumbai and the recent strikes in Mumbai. If that is so, we suspect that Pakistan's terrorism in India is a mutually agreed-upon concept created by both sides in order to exploit and squander their respective citizens. Now, they say that the LTTE is a terrorist organization, hence the war. It says they killed Rajiv Gandhi. Rajiv Gandhi is not a councillor or a district secretary. When a Sinhalese attempted to kill him in Sri Lanka, he was not interrogated. One of my demands is that the Sinhalese soldier who tried to kill him earlier must also be included in the list of the accused and he must be interrogated again. The Tigers might have been sad with Rajiv, but they wouldn't have been angry with him. Because Rajiv was Indira's son. Indira, is next to MGR among the small gods who populate Tamil Eelam.

It has been clearly exposed that India is opposed to justice form the fact that it often changes the explanations that it offers. In such a situation, Sri Lanka said, Why don't you directly interfere, the Tigers are making use of the ceasefire to stock up weapons. Chandrika, or Ranil, or Mahinda were not gods in the past, they have not even behaved as human beings. Just because they agreed to the ceasefire in view of their compulsions, how could it be argued that the fighters should lay down their arms, or that they should not involve themselves in reconstruction activities. Only by bringing about the faith and confidence that you will behave honestly and truthfully, you can make the fighters lay down their weapons. No government in the past has honoured their promises. For instance, Ranil-Karuna. But the Tigers have not used the ceasefire to simply acquire weapons, but they have created a governmental administrative structure. Is this terrorism in the eyes of the world? India is trying to ingratiate itself by saying that it is fighting in order to save the innocent Tamils. Only sophisticated weaponry and spy planes from India are going to Sri Lanka; can they show a single paracetomol tablet that has gone from India? In such a state, they want us to believe that the Sri Lankan government will provide all the amenities for the people of Eelam, and that India will support this endeavour.

Now, they are attacking the ambulance of the International Committee of Red Cross, are they also Tamil Tigers? They killed 17 aid workers from France, were they Tamil Tigers? China's tanks, India's spy planes, Pakistan's artillery... not only these kill our people, but the silence of the International Community also kills them. When will you realize this—after a people who greatly desire justice are totally wiped away from the face of the earth? If you are interested in adding us to the list of Aborigines, Maya and Inca peoples, each day one of us will come in front of you and kill ourselves, as it comes in one of our myths.... Please leave our sisters and our children alone. We are unable to bear this. We are fighting with the sole hope that one day we will watch them laugh whole-heartedly. Even if we accept for the sake of rhetoric that the LTTE should be punished, we must realize that both India and Sri Lanka lack the moral ground to hand out any punishment.

Justice derailed is worse than justice denied.

1. The International Community must condemn India and force it to immediately withdraw its troops from Sri Lanka, and be prevented from helping Sri Lanka through satellites and radars. Even unimportant discussions between the Governments of India and Sri Lanka should take place through the International Community. India should publicly apologize before the people of Tamil Nadu and the people of Tamil Eelam scattered across the world.

2. Because the UN Secretary General Ban Ki Moon is always functioning with a bias towards his homeland China, he must not be given the power to take any decision regarding Eelam.

3. All the countries who have banned the LTTE based on the request from Sri Lanka should immediately revoke the ban and unconditionally release all those who have been arrested because they belong to the LTTE.

4. Members of the LTTE should be forgiven for their passport related mistakes, and they should be immediately released.

5. The industries which have been banned based on the allegation that they are connected to the Tigers, should be given the licenses once again, and they should also be adequately compensated.

6. Rajiv Gandhi's murder should be investigated by the InterPol and the real guilty must be exposed.

7. Pranab Mukherjee, Gotabhaya Rajapakse, Chandrika, Udayanakkara, Kekaliya Rambukawela, Basil Rajapakse, Mahinda and Fonseka should be subjected to narco-analysis.

8. While the International Community shall have the right to recognize Tamil Eelam which is going to be formed, only the people of Tamil Eelam shall have the right to decide under whose leadership it should be formed.

9. When the Tigers were weakened militarily, the Upcountry Tamils were targeted, and it is feared that in the future that area might be subjected to a major genocidal pogrom. So, a referendum must be conducted among the Upcountry Tamils to know whether they want to join Tamil Eelam. In this matter, the decision of the Upcountry Tamils shall be final.

10. Douglas Devananda, who was punished by the courts for firing at innocent Tamil people in Chennai under the influence of alcohol escaped to Sri Lanka before the period of imprisonment was completed. He must therefore be arrested and handed over to the Tamil Nadu police.

11. Everyone responsible for the murder of journalist Lasanta should be punished.

12. The Sinhalese journalists who have sought refuge in Tamil Nadu must be given adequate protection.

13. The Sinhalese couple who came as refugees to Tamil Nadu must be recognized as refugees, and the charges of passport-doctoring against them must be dropped.

14. The livelihood of families of Tamil fishermen shot dead should be secured.

With eternal love, 
Your brother against injustice, 
Ku. Muthukumar, Kolathur, Chennai 99.

Dear Tamil people, in the struggle against injustice our brothers and children have taken up the weapon of the intellect. I have used the weapon of life. You use the weapon of photocopying. Yes, make copies of this pamphlet and distribute it to your friends, relatives, and students and ensure that this support for this struggle becomes greater. Nan'ri.

References

Suicides in India
Suicides by self-immolation
1982 births
2009 deaths
2009 suicides
Indian activist journalists
Activists from Tamil Nadu
Journalists from Tamil Nadu
Writers from Tamil Nadu
21st-century Indian non-fiction writers
21st-century Indian journalists
Sri Lankan Civil War protests
India–Sri Lanka relations
Indian Peace Keeping Force